Forklift Driver Klaus – The First Day on the Job is a German short film from 2000 about the first day of Klaus' work as a forklift driver. The film is a parody of work safety films from the 1980s.

The film was written and directed by Stefan Prehn and Jörg Wagner and stars Konstantin Graudus as the title role of Klaus. The narration was provided by Egon Hoegen, who was known in Germany for narrating road safety films.

The film quickly became famous, thanks in part to its splatter film violence, which fans regard as comical due to its extreme and obviously fake nature. The film received several awards and was made available on DVD by Anolis Entertainment in 2003, dubbed in English, French, and Spanish.

Plot
The film is presented as a safety instruction video for forklift truck drivers and shows the first day of work for newly qualified forklift truck driver Klaus. The film highlights, in a gory manner, the dangers of unsafe operation of machinery, as well as inattention as a result of chitchatting and distraction by a female coworker passing by.

Shortly after Klaus' first operation of the forklift, he nearly hits a co-worker leaving the warehouse by walking across the garage door where walking is forbidden, instead of the pedestrian exit door. While this causes no injury, it is a hint for what would be coming. As the film progresses the injuries/deaths become more brutal, beginning with things like a man falling from the forklift after he was lifted without a safety cage to hold onto but a bare wooden platform, and closing with the most violent: ending in a stray chainsaw being driven around by a severed arm on the floor, reaching and ripping through a man who had already been cut in half waist-down due to Klaus' previous accident. A gory POV shot of the chainsaw chopping through the man is shown. The warehouse's alarm bell ends up falling from its mount due to corrosion from blood stains, and lands on a head as apparent from a screaming sound. The film ends as Klaus is decapitated by the chainsaw and two men are left impaled onto the forklift prongs, screaming. The forklift drives off into the sunset as the impaled men continue to scream with the chainsaw racing after them.
The closing musical theme, "Happyland", was written by French composer Laurent Lombard.

Cast 

  as Forklift Driver Klaus
 Egon Hoegen as narrator 
 Sönke Korres as Plummetting Helmut
 Erik Rossbander as Werner the Knife
 Till Huster as No Hands Günther
 Dieter Dost as Bisected Herbert
 Jürgen Kossel as Chainsaw Rudi
 Douglas Welbat as Headphone Paul
 Gustav Adolph Artz as Seminar Instructor
 Clarissa Schröter as Secretary

Usage as a safety film

Although the film is not officially part of the German training and education system for forklift trucks, it has been shown by some instructors as an example of what forklift drivers should not do.

Awards
The film has won many awards, including:
 The Canal+ International Award for Best Short Film at the Cinema Jove Festival Internacional de Cine València in 2001
 The Jury Award for Best Short Film and the Audience Award for Best Short Film at the San Sebastian Horror and Fantasy Film Festival in 2001
 The Audience Award for Short Film and the Special Prize of the European Broadcasters Jury for Best Original Idea at the Brussels International Festival of Fantasy Film in 2002
 The Friedrich-Wilhelm-Murnau-Award at the Day of the German Short Film awards in 2002
 The German Film Critics Award for Best Short Film at the German Film Critics Association Awards in 2002
 The Jury Prize for Best Short Film at the Fantasia Film Festival in 2003 (where it also won 3rd place in the Best Short Film category)

References

External links
 

 

2000 films
2000 comedy films
Slapstick films
2000s parody films
German black comedy films
German parody films
German comedy short films
German splatter films
2000 short films
2000s German films